Deranged may refer to psychosis, a generic psychiatric term for a mental state often described as involving a "loss of contact with reality".

Deranged may also refer to:

In films:
 Deranged (1974 film), a 1974 American horror film
 Deranged (1987 film), a 1987 American Horror B Movie film 
 Deranged (2012 film), a 2012 South Korean science fiction, horror and thriller film
 Idaho Transfer, a 1973 American film also known under its UK video title of Deranged
In music:
 Deranged (band), a Swedish death metal band formed in 1991
 Deranged Records, a Canadian punk record label
In television:
 Deranged (TV series), a television series shown on the Investigation Discovery network

Other uses:
 Deranged, a type of drainage system (geomorphology)
 Ibrahim of the Ottoman Empire (1615–1648), Ottoman Sultan called Ibrahim the Deranged
 Derangement, in combinatorial mathematics, a permutation of the elements of a set in which none of the elements appear in their original position